Francistown is the second largest city in Botswana, with a population of about 103,417 and 147,122 inhabitants for its agglomeration at the 2022 census. and often described as the "Capital of the North" or as the natives would have it “Turopo ya muka” which is in the iKalanga language. Francistown is located at the confluence of the Tati and Ntshe rivers, and near the Shashe River (tributary to the Limpopo) and 90 kilometres (55 miles) from the international border with Zimbabwe. 

Francistown was the centre of Southern Africa's first gold rush and is still surrounded by old and abandoned mines. The City of Francistown is an administrative district, separated from North-East District. It is administered by Francistown City Council.The main language spoken and used in and around Francistown is the Kalanga language. Other languages used in the area are isiNdebele, ChiShona as well as SeTswana.

History

Although evidence of habitation by humans goes back around 10,000 years, written evidence is more recent. Historical evidence shows that Francistown started off as one of the villages of the BaKalanga people which was best known for its mining. Mining which used to be a common activity and influence to the BaKalanga/Kalanga area of north-eastern Botswana was widely practiced in the area-mostly gold mining. Reportedly, Nyangabgwe was the nearest village to Francistown to have been visited by Europeans, when it was visited by the missionary, Robert Moffat. Moffat was followed in 1867 by a gold prospector, Karl Mauch who found the Bakalanga mining gold along the Tati River, and publicised the Tati Goldfields starting the first Southern Africa goldrush.

The present town was founded in 1897 as a settlement near the Monarch mine and named after Daniel Francis, an English prospector from Liverpool who acquired prospecting licences in the region in 1869. Francis was a director of the Tati Concessions Land (Tati Concessions Company), which acquired the land from King Lobengula. The centre of the new town was formed when the company sold off 300 lots in August of that year. The Monarch mine was not the only mine in operation at that time, and it was widely believed that Francistown would grow rapidly.

In the beginning, the town comprised one street east of, and parallel to the railway line. This street featured several companies, including two hotels, (the Grand and the Tati), retail and wholesale shops and three banks.

Prior to independence Francistown was Botswana's largest commercial centre. In 1897, the company sold part of the land for residential and commercial purposes, and one may say that this marked the birth of Francistown. The city started as a gold mining town, and gold sustained the area's economy from the late 1800s until the 1930s. When gold was discovered nearby in 1869 it sparked the first gold rush in Africa fifteen years before the gold boom at Witwatersrand in South Africa. The industry was hard hit by the global recession of the 1930s. Between 1936 and 1980s, the economy of Francistown was largely supported or dependent on the Witwatersrand Native Labour Association, a company that recruited labour for South African mines. The miners were recruited from many African countries, and transported to South Africa through Francistown by air or railway.

Haskins Street (named after a prominent family in the town prior to independence) was the first tarred road in Botswana. Since 1966, the city has grown significantly due mainly to active cross-border trading with Rhodesia/Zimbabwe, in 1997, Francistown became a city, Botswana's 2nd after Gaborone. With the city located astride Botswana's main road and rail transport routes, mining, commerce and agriculture have been essential parts of its economy. Tati Nickel, The Dumela Industrial Complex and Botswana Meat Commission are the main economic drivers in the city. Both government departments and private benefit the local economy.

There are a variety of places of worship, including Catholic churches, Muslim mosques, as well as Protestant churches some of which serve traditional African congregations such as the Zionist Christian Church. Education around the city is also diverse. There are several private English-medium schools (Mophato School, KTM and John Mackenzie School) and government schools such as Mater Spei College (partly run by the Roman Catholic Church), Francistown Teacher Training College, University of Botswana Campus and several technical colleges. Transport is also reliable, with railway links to Harare and Bulawayo in Zimbabwe, road links with Ramokgwebana Border in the north, and Kazungula as well as Kasane, Maun via Nata. The airport has flights flying locally, to Gaborone, Maun, Kasane and other points around the country. Local taxis operate through the night.

Economy

Mining
Francistown is located on Botswana's main air and road transport routes; mining and agriculture are important.  Principal mining companies include Tati Nickel, owned by Norilsk Nickel, which has operations at the Selkirk Mine and Phoenix Mine, producing principally cobalt, copper and nickel. The Dumela Industrial Complex, an industrial park, is an important employer; the Botswana Metal Refinery was being built in 2008 near the city. However, the project was halted due to high costs.

Media

The city's media fraternity is still at its infant stage. The media includes Botswana's The Voice newspaper, which was founded in 1993. This is a very popular tabloid newspaper that had also spread its wings to the capital city, Gaborone.

Climate 

Francistown features a hot semi-arid climate, with warm to hot summers and mild winters. The city on averages sees  of precipitation annually. The city features a short wet season that spans from December through March and a lengthy dry season that covers the remaining eight months. Francistown receives on average only  of precipitation at the peak of its dry season (from June through August), which is also when it experiences its chilliest temperatures. Average low temperatures routinely fall below  during the aforementioned months.

Demographics and health

Ever since the founding of Francistown as a gold mining and railway centre in the nineteenth century, the city's population has consistently shown a steady increase. Francistown is Botswana's second largest city with 22.7% of the country's urban population in 1991. The growth of Selebi-Phikwe, Orapa and Jwaneng since 1971, together with the very rapid growth of Gaborone, has reduced Francistown's share of the total urban population from a figure of 34.7% in 1971. In the same period (1971-1991), the country's urban population grew by 427.2% from 54 411 to a population of 287,063.
The Bakalanga, the second largest ethnic group in Botswana are traditionally centred around the town and the surrounding area. Recently, the city has seen a large influx of illegal immigrants from neighbouring Zimbabwe.

Culture
Francistown is home to the Supa Ngwao Museum, with exhibits related to the area's history and heritage.  The museum, which receives most of its funds from the government, is currently going through refurbishment as of October 2011.  A new nature reserve, Tachila, has been established  from central Francistown on an old Tati Company Farm, Lady Mary.  The nature reserve is expected to be a tourism turn-over for the already flourishing city with its variety of wild animals.

Places of worship 

Among the places of worship, they are predominantly Christian churches and temples : Evangelical Lutheran Church in Botswana (Lutheran World Federation), Assemblies of God, the Church of Jesus Christ of Latter-day Saints, International Pentecostal Holiness Church, Christ Embassy, Roman Catholic Diocese of Francistown (Catholic Church).

Education

The city has primary schools on almost all its townships, most if not all of which are run by the city council. Notable amongst these are Ikhutseng Primary School, Tati Town Primary School and Nyangabgwe Primary School, which are one of the oldest in the city. There is also Aerodrome Primary School, which has graduated notable citizens like Tony Tabona, the pride of the city's media and entertainment fraternity. The government also has junior high schools, trading as "secondary schools". Most of these were started as partnerships between government and society. It was only recently that the government took most of these over. Examples of these include Setlalekgosi, Montsamaisa and Selepa Junior Secondary Schools. These offer the best education at JC level and have a three-year course.
There are private schools in the city as well, amongst others the historic and famous John Mackenzie School, which offers primary, junior secondary as well as senior secondary education. The school also offers O-Levels for students who have pursued the IGCS Examination. There is also Mophato English Medium School, TKM, Clifton Preparatory School and many more other smaller private schools.
There are currently two senior secondary schools in Francistown, being Mater Spei College, partly ran by the Roman Catholic Church and Francistown Senior Secondary School, opened in 1978 and currently enrolling 1200 students. Located in the history-rich township of Aerodrome, it is one of the largest institutions in the city.
The Francistown Teacher Training College became one of the campuses of the University of Botswana in 1973. 
The Francistown College of Technical and Vocational Education was officially opened by former president of Botswana Ian Khama on 10 October 2008. The college was built in order to accommodate 1,500 learners on technical and vocational courses and teacher-training programmes. The college buildings are situated amongst a  area in the suburbs of Gerald Estates. The city also hosts the Institute of Health Sciences, which is located near the Nyangabwe Referral Hospital. The institution, amongst others, offers courses in nursing and health care.

Transport and infrastructure

The city is a major transport hub. A railway line links the city with Harare in Zimbabwe via Bulawayo. The same line links Francistown with the capital city Gaborone and Lobatse in the south. Surfaced roads link the city to Ramokgwebana in the north, and to Kazungula as well as Kasane via Nata.

The city is served by Francistown International Airport, who was opened on 9 September 2011 after being built at a cost of P596 million, officially opened by Minister of Transport, Frank Ramsden. With a terminal building designated for traffic forecast of up to 2025, it has a larger capacity and has replaced the old airport, which is now used by the Botswana Defence Force's Air Arm.

Malls and plazas

Tati River Mall — behind the Nzano Center
Tati Shopping Center — includes all the shops in Blue Jacket street
Blue Jacket Square
Barclays Plaza
Nzano Center — includes the Barcelos restaurant, Debonairs Pizza, as well as clothing shops, like Mr. Price, and the Cash Bazaar store;
The Village Mall — hosts the elite Diggers Inn, which offers first-class accommodation;
Galo Shopping Center — has notable restaurants, like Milky Lane, Nando's; banks, such as FNB Botswana; as well as supermarkets, like Pick n Pay for the city residents' shopping needs;
Golden Valley Mall — pays homage to Marang Superspar;
Nswazi Shopping Mall — also pays host to different shops and supermarkets, like SPAR; as well as eateries, like Chicken Licken, and KFC.

Sports 

Based at the Francistown Club, the Francistown School of Tennis is a professional tennis centre dedicated to developing young children (starting at 4 years old) into international tennis players.

Francistown also hosts several football clubs. These include TAFIC Sporting Club, TASC FC, ECCO City Greens FC, Great North Tigers FC (GNT) and others.

All the teams have played in the country's highest league, Botswana Premier League, sponsored currently by BTC Mobile. GNT was recently promoted to the Premier League, while TAFIC play in the lower division. The new Francistown Stadium is still under construction, and will be complete soon.  The stadium will be the largest in the northern part of Botswana, with a capacity of 27,000 spectators, and will be home ground to some of the above teams. Other stadiums in the city include the Francistown City Council's Area S stadium.

Twin towns – sister cities
Francistown is twinned with:
 Genk, Belgium
 Tai'an, China

See also
 James G. Haskins
 Lepashe River
 Mathangwane Village

References

External links 
 Francistown School of Tennis
 Francistown Senior Secondary School

 
Cities in Botswana
Populated places established in 1897
North-East District (Botswana)
Shashe River
1897 establishments in the British Empire